Heimdal is a census-designated place and unincorporated community in Wells County, North Dakota, United States. Its population was 16 as of the 2020 census.

History
On May 6, 2015, a train carrying oil derailed and caught fire near Heimdal.

Geography
Heimdal is located at  (47.792778, −99.645).

Demographics

2010 census
As of the census of 2010, there were 27 people, 13 households, and 6 families residing in the CDP. The racial makeup of the CDP was 100.0% White.

There were 13 households, of which 23.1% had children under the age of 18 living with them, 38.5% were married couples living together, 7.7% had a female householder with no husband present, and 53.8% were non-families. 46.2% of all households were made up of individuals, and 38.5% had someone living alone who was 65 years of age or older. The average household size was 2.08 and the average family size was 3.17.

The median age in the CDP was 43.8 years. 29.6% of residents were under the age of 18; 3.7% were between the ages of 18 and 24; 22.2% were from 25 to 44; 11.1% were from 45 to 64; and 33.3% were 65 years of age or older. The gender makeup of the CDP was 33.3% male and 66.7% female.

References

External links
 Heimdal Diamond Jubilee, 1910–1985 from the Digital Horizons website

Census-designated places in Wells County, North Dakota
Census-designated places in North Dakota
Unincorporated communities in North Dakota
Unincorporated communities in Wells County, North Dakota